WLAE-TV, virtual channel 32 (UHF digital channel 23), is an educational independent television station licensed to New Orleans, Louisiana, United States. The station is owned by the Educational Broadcasting Foundation, a partnership between the Willwoods Community (a Catholic-related organization) and the Louisiana Educational Television Authority (operator of Louisiana Public Broadcasting, which owns the PBS member stations in Louisiana that are located outside of New Orleans). WLAE's studios are located on Howard Ave. in New Orleans, and its transmitter is located on Paris Road/Highway 47 (northeast of Chalmette). On cable, the station is available on Cox Communications channel 14.

History

As a PBS member station

In 1978, a group of married couples, supported by the Catholic Church, formed the Willwoods Community. The organization joined forces with the Louisiana Educational Television Authority, which had been looking for a way to get its locally based programming into the state's largest market, to obtain the other non-commercial license allocated to the New Orleans market. On December 14, 1981, under the banner of the "Educational Broadcasting Foundation," the partnership was granted an educational station license from the Federal Communications Commission (FCC).

WLAE-TV first signed on the air on July 8, 1984; it originally served as a member station of the Public Broadcasting Service (PBS). WLAE-TV operated as a secondary member of the network through PBS' Program Differentiation Plan, as New Orleans' primary PBS station was WYES-TV (channel 12); as a result, the station only carried 25% of the programming broadcast by PBS. As a side note, Sesame Street was one of the few programs that was shown on both stations. In addition to offering PBS programming, WLAE also aired, and still airs, locally produced educational programs, as well as select programming from Louisiana Public Broadcasting (mostly consisting of news and public affairs programming).

WLAE is also one of very few public television stations to televise a daily Catholic Mass, presented live from the St. Louis Cathedral in the city's Jackson Square district; PBS had tightened its restrictions regarding religious programming on member stations in 2009, although WLAE was exempted from these restrictions through a grandfather clause. WLAE was one of at least two PBS member stations that were owned at least in part by a Catholic-related organization (KMBH in Harlingen, Texas was the other; it is now Fox affiliate KFXV, owned by commercial media company Entravision Communications), and one of at least three in general that were run by a religious organization (counting KBYU-TV in Provo, Utah, which left PBS in 2018).

In 2000, WLAE and WYES both received a $691,000 grant from the Corporation for Public Broadcasting to negotiate and establish joint production and master control facilities. The two stations' operators agreed to build the facility on the grounds of a Lakefront research park owned by the University of New Orleans. In 2005, WLAE and WYES planned a campaign to raise $4 million in capital on behalf of their relocation plan. During most of 2016, WLAE underwent a technical upgrade, preventing the airing of its programming on its three subchannels, but it is now at full programming.

Hurricane Katrina

When Hurricane Katrina struck the New Orleans metropolitan area on August 29, 2005, WLAE was knocked off the air due to significant damage to its transmitter. It took two years for the station's over-the-air signal to be restored. Soon after the storm, it established a direct feed to New Orleans area cable providers (including the market's largest, Cox Communications) and to satellite provider DirecTV. The station's analog signal resumed operations in January 2007, its digital signal signed on the air for the first time two months later in March 2007.

Meanwhile, the University of New Orleans campus suffered major damage due to the storm. WYES and WLAE management agreed to forgo plans to build the new studio facility at the research park. Instead, the money earmarked for that project was used to purchase new master control equipment to replace the equipment at the WLAE studios that had been damaged by the storm.

As an educational independent station
On August 1, 2013, WLAE ended its membership with PBS to increase its focus on its locally produced programming; WYES became the market's exclusive PBS station once again as a result. The station had contemplated the move since the Louisiana state government reduced the station's funding by $270,000 in 2010. The decision to drop PBS programming was estimated to save the station around $130,000 annually (out of an annual budget of $2.3 million), allowing WLAE to invest the money into its local productions. The station's departure from PBS resulted in the PBS NewsHour only being available through WYES-TV's World subchannel on digital channel 12.2 until it was added to that station's primary channel the following month on September 2, 2013; the program had aired on WLAE under a longstanding arrangement with WYES. The station is considering entering into production and business partnerships with WYES.

Digital television

Digital channels
The station's digital signal is multiplexed:

Analog-to-digital conversion
WLAE-TV shut down its analog signal, over UHF channel 32, on June 12, 2009, the official date in which full-power television stations in the United States transitioned from analog to digital broadcasts under federal mandate. The station's digital signal continued to broadcasts on its pre-transition UHF channel 31. Through the use of PSIP, digital television receivers display the station's virtual channel as its former UHF analog channel 32.

Programming
As a non-commercial independent station, much of WLAE's programming currently consists of locally produced programs as well as programs distributed by American Public Television (APT) and other distributors of syndicated public television programs. The station's original productions include the hour-long health discussion program Hello Health (which debuted in 2008 under a partnership with the Ochsner Medical Center); the legal discussion program John Redman: Power of Attorney; the Hispanic-targeted monthly magazine series Conexiones; interior design how-to program Chet Chat; and interview and discussion program Ringside Politics. It also airs many programs from part-owner LPB, including its flagship news program, Louisiana: The State We're In.

In October 2022, WLAE-TV aired a documentary about the historic African American village of Fazendeville, Louisiana, entitled "Battlegrounds: The Lost Community of Fazendeville." As part of its educational outreach for the program, the station also held a special screening of the documentary at the St. Bernard Docville Farm in Violet on October 30. The event was supported by the Mereux Foundation.

See also
Catholic television
Catholic television channels
Catholic television networks

References

External links
WLAE.com - WLAE official website
willwoods.org - The Willwoods Community official website

Television stations in New Orleans
Independent television stations in the United States
Catholic television channels
Television channels and stations established in 1984
1984 establishments in Louisiana